The Bayer designations c Centauri and C Centauri are distinct.

The designation c Centauri is shared by two star systems in the constellation Centaurus:
 c1 Centauri (HD 129456)
 c2 Centauri (HD 129685)

The designation C Centauri is shared by three star systems:
 C1 Centauri (V763 Centauri)
 C2 Centauri (HD 100825)
 C3 Centauri (HD 101067)

See also
 γ Centauri
 Alpha Centauri C (Proxima Centauri)
 σ Centauri
 3 Centauri

Centauri, c
Centaurus (constellation)